The Arts District is a section of downtown Portland, Maine’s designated in 1995 as to promote the cultural community and creative economy of the city. It covers a large part of upper Congress Street towards the West End. There are many art galleries, a theater company, museums, and schools in the general area. Both Maine College of Art (MECA) and Portland Museum of Art are located in the district. Congress Square Park, a small urban park across the street from the Museum of Art, often referred to as the "Heart of the Arts District," frequently hosts community-based arts and cultural events.

An event that occurs in the district is the First Friday Art Walk — a self-guided tour that takes place on the first Friday of each month from 5 p.m. to 8 p.m. All of the galleries, museums, and local businesses open their doors to the public for a view of everything that is going on in the art community. Most galleries host the event with food and drink. The Portland Museum of Art opens its doors to the public free of charge.

The Arts District is home to two television stations (WCSH and WMTW) and several radio stations. It is also home to the State Theatre building and the Portland Stage Company. There are many coffee shops, bars and restaurants, such as Green Elephant Vegetarian Bistro, in the district.

External links 
 Portland, Maine - Arts District
 First Friday Art Walk - Portland, Maine

References 

Neighborhoods in Portland, Maine
Culture of Portland, Maine
Arts districts